Marko Luković (born May 26, 1992) is a Serbian professional basketball player for Breogán of the Liga ACB. He is 2.07 m tall power forward.

Professional career
Luković played in youth categories with Mega Vizura. He made his debut with the first team in March 2009. In July 2014, he left Mega and signed with German club TBB Trier for the 2014–15 season.

On August 17, 2015, he signed with MZT Skopje for the 2015–16 season. With MZT he won the Macedonian League championship and Macedonian Cup trophy. He was also named the Macedonian Cup MVP.

On July 6, 2016, he signed with Krka for the 2016–17 season. On July 22, 2017, he signed with UCAM Murcia for the 2017–18 season. On March 8, 2018, he parted ways with Murcia. Five days later, he signed with ESSM Le Portel.

On August 17, 2018, he signed with Baxi Manresa for the 2018–19 season. On January 10, 2019, he signed with Igokea for the rest of the 2018–19 season.

On December 28, 2019, he signed with Koper Primorska for the rest of the 2019–20 season. He averaged 14 points and 6.6 rebounds per game in ABA league, including two wild game winning buzzerbeaters. On 13 July 2020 he extended his contract with Koper Primorska.

On September 23, 2020, Luković signed for the Croatian team Split for the 2020–21 season.

National team career
Luković was a member of the Serbian junior national teams. With Serbia U-18 team he played at the 2010 FIBA Europe Under-18 Championship in Lithuania. Two years later he played at the 2012 FIBA Europe Under-20 Championship in Slovenia.

Personal life
Marko comes from a basketball family. In fact, his father Ljubisav Luković, is a former basketball player and current basketball coach, and his mother is also former basketball player. Marko has an older brother Uroš and younger sister Branka who are also professional basketball players.

Career statistics

Domestic leagues

References

External links
 Marko Luković at aba-liga.com
 Marko Luković at acb.com
 Marko Luković at beobasket.net
 
 Marko Luković at fiba.com

1992 births
Living people
ABA League players
Basketball players from Belgrade
Basketball League of Serbia players
Bàsquet Manresa players
CB Breogán players
CB Murcia players
ESSM Le Portel players
Forwards (basketball)
KK Igokea players
KK Krka players
KK Mega Basket players
KK MZT Skopje players
KK Split players
Liga ACB players
Serbian expatriate basketball people in Bosnia and Herzegovina
Serbian expatriate basketball people in Croatia
Serbian expatriate basketball people in France
Serbian expatriate basketball people in Germany
Serbian expatriate basketball people in North Macedonia
Serbian expatriate basketball people in Slovenia
Serbian expatriate basketball people in Spain
Serbian men's basketball players